Anisotremus virginicus, the porkfish, also known as the Atlantic porkfish sweetlips, dogfish or paragrate grunt, is a species of marine ray-finned fish, a grunt belonging to the family Haemulidae. It is native to the western Atlantic Ocean.

Description
Anisotremus virginicus has a deep, compressed body with a very high back and a short, blunt head. The mouth is positioned low on the head, it is horizontal with fleshy lips and the jaws are equipped with bands of teeth on both jaws. The outer band of teeth are conical in shape. The flanks are marked with alternating yellow and silver stripes. There is a black bar running diagonally from over the eye to the upper lip and a second, vertical black bar runs from the front of the dorsal fin to the base of the pectoral fin. They have yellow fins, the caudal fin is deeply forked. The juveniles do not have the two black bars and have two black stripes which run horizontally along the middle of the flanks and a black blotch close to the caudal fin base and the head is vivid yellow. The dorsal fin contains 12 spines and 16-18 soft rays while the anal fin contains 3 spines and 9 soft rays.

Distribution
Anisotremus virginicus is found in the western Atlantic Ocean from northeastern Florida south along its Atlantic coast to the Bahamas, then westwards into the Gulf of Mexico from the Florida Keys north to New Port Richey on Florida’s Gulf coast. Within the Gulf it is found at the Flower Garden Banks and on the Mexican coast as far south as the northern Yucatan Peninsula and also northwestern Cuba. It then ranges southwards throughout the Caribbean Sea, to South America as far south as Rio de Janeiro. It can also be found at Fernando de Noronha and Atoll das Rocas. It is found at Bermuda where it was introduced.

Habitat and biology
The juveniles are found in beds of sea grass. It is a nocturnal species which frequently moves around in large schools, occasionally swimming with white grunts. This species can produce a grunting sound, as can all the grunts, by grinding their teeth together. It feeds mainly on benthic invertebrates such as molluscs, crustaceans, echinoderms, polychaetes and annelids. The juveniles act as cleaner fish.

Systematics
Anisotremus virginicus was first formally described in 1758 as Sparus virginicus by Linnaeus with the type locality given as South America. When the American ichthyologist Theodore Nicholas Gill created the genus Anisotremus he named Sparus virginicus as its type species.

Utilisation
Anisotremus virginicus is of minor importance to commercial fisheries and is caught using a variety of methods. The are considered a good sports fishing quarry. They do appear in the aquarium trade. They have been bred in captivity.

References

External links
 
 Video of Porkfish - Video taken in Belize off Ambergris Caye.

virginicus
Fish of the Atlantic Ocean
Fish described in 1758
Taxa named by Carl Linnaeus